Robert South (4 September 1634 – 8 July 1716) was an English churchman who was known for his combative preaching and his Latin poetry.

Early life

He was the son of Robert South, a London merchant, and Elizabeth Berry. He was born at Hackney, Middlesex, and was educated at Westminster School under Richard Busby, and at Christ Church, Oxford, matriculating on 11 December 1651.

Among his college exercises was a panegyric on Oliver Cromwell in Latin verse on the conclusion of peace at the end of the First Anglo-Dutch War (5 April 1654). He commenced B.A. on 24 February 1654–5. On account of his using the Book of Common Prayer John Owen, then Dean of Christ Church and vice-chancellor, unsuccessfully opposed his proceeding M.A. on 12 June 1657. South travelled on the continent, and in 1658 privately received episcopal ordination, perhaps from Thomas Sydserf. He was incorporated M.A. at Cambridge in 1659. His assize sermon at St. Mary's on 24 July 1659 was an attack on the Independents, with a sample of the humour for which South became famous. In his university sermon on 29 July 1660 he included the Presbyterians in his invective, referring to Henry Wilkinson as 'Holderforth.'

Under Charles II
He was chosen public orator to the university on 10 August 1660, an office which he held till 1677. Edward Hyde, 1st Earl of Clarendon made him his chaplain, in consequence of his oration on his installation as chancellor (15 November). On 30 March 1663 he was installed prebendary of Westminster. On 1 Oct. 1663 he was created B.D. and D.D. on letters from Clarendon. The creation was opposed in convocation by those who reckoned South a time-server. On a scrutiny, Nathaniel Crew, the senior proctor, declared the majority to be for South, who was presented by John Wallis. He was incorporated D.D. at Cambridge in 1664. Clarendon gave him in 1667 the sinecure rectory of Llanrhaiadr-y-Mochnant, Denbighshire, and on Clarendon's fall, at the end of that year, he became chaplain to James, Duke of York.

South's ridicule of the Royal Society, in an oration at the dedication of the Sheldonian Theatre, July 1669, called forth a remonstrance from Wallis, addressed to Robert Boyle. South was installed canon of Christ Church on 29 Dec. 1670.

A zealous advocate of the doctrine of passive obedience, he strongly opposed the Toleration Act, declaiming in unmeasured terms against the various Nonconformist sects.  In 1676 he was appointed chaplain to Lawrence Hyde, Earl of Rochester, ambassador-extraordinary to the king of Poland, and he sent an account of his visit to Edward Pococke in a letter, dated Dantzic, 16 December 1677, which was printed along with South's Posthumous Works in 1717. In 1678 he was presented to the rectory of Islip, Oxfordshire.

He lived at Caversham, near Reading, Berkshire, where he had an estate. South was chaplain in ordinary to Charles II, but had no other preferment from him than the Westminster prebend.

Under James II
In James II's reign Rochester, then lord-lieutenant of Ireland, is said to have offered South an Irish archbishopric (Cashel was vacant, 1685–91). Rochester nominated South (November 1686) as one of two Anglican divines to discuss points of doctrine with two of the church of Rome; but James objected to South, and Simon Patrick was substituted.

Under William and Mary
At the Glorious Revolution South hesitated to transfer his allegiance, being, according to White Kennett, under the influence of William Sherlock, D.D. He at length took the oath, adopting the parliamentary fiction that James's flight constituted an abdication. He is said to have declined a bishopric vacated by a nonjuror. He opposed the scheme for a comprehension of dissenters, but was not a member either of the royal commission (13 September 1689) on the subject, or of the convocation of that year.

In 1693 South intervened anonymously in the Socinian controversy, with strong animus against Sherlock, his Animadversions on Dr Sherlock's Book, entitled a Vindication of the Holy and Ever Blessed Trinity (1690) being 'humbly offered to his admirers, and to himself the chief of them.' He made galling references to Sherlock's career, 'tainted with a conventicle' at the outset; vehemently assailed his earlier writings as heterodox on the doctrine of atonement, and maintained his 'new notion' of the Trinity to be tritheistic; an opinion reiterated in his ''Tritheism Charged upon Dr Sherlock's New Notion of the Trinity, and the Charge Made Good (1695). The anonymity of these attacks was transparent. It is not certain that South was the translator of A Short History of Valentinus Gentilis the Tritheist (1696) from the Latin of Benedict Aretius; the dedication to the hierarchy is in his manner, and there is a reference to Gentilis in Tritheism Charged. p. 47. South's position is mainly that of Wallis; but he chiefly devotes learning and to demolishing Sherlock. Public judgment on the controversy was expressed in William Pittis's ballad, 'The Battle Royal'. The controversy was carried into the pulpit, and made for such sharp feelings that the king interposed to stop it.

Under Queen Anne

During the greater part of the reign of Anne South remained comparatively quiet; his health was broken. He roused himself in 1710 to take part on the High Church side in the affair of Henry Sacheverell. On the death (20 May 1713) of Thomas Sprat the bishopric of Rochester and deanery of Westminster were offered to him; but he turned them down. He died at Westminster on 8 July 1716, and was buried in Westminster Abbey. South gave orders that his ashes should rest near those of Richard Busby. At the south wall of the sanctuary stands a large monument of white marble with a reclining figure, right arm on a cushion, and hand on a skull, and a closed book in the left. The background is framed by two fluted Corinthian column, on either side of an inscription tablet, surmounted by a glory, and two cherubs on drapery.  On the cornice is an armorial cartouche decorated with floral festoons, between two flaming urns.

Works
He published a large number of sermons, and they appeared in a collected form in 1692 in six volumes, reaching a second edition in his lifetime in 1715. There have been several later issues; one in two volumes, with a memoir (Henry George Bohn, 1845).

His Opera posthuma Latina, including his will, his Latin poems (among them the at South's time well-known witty poem Musica incantans about the power of music), and his orations while public orator, with memoirs of his life, appeared in 1717. An edition of his works in 7 vols. was published at Oxford in 1823, another in 5 vols in 1842.

He was praised for his wit, though Mark Noble wrote that once, whilst giving a sermon to Charles II, he observed the entire congregation had gone to sleep - Noble remarks that, "Stopping and changing the tone of his voice, he called thrice to Lord Lauderdale, who, awakened, stood up: "My Lord" says South very composedly "I am sorry to interrupt your repose, but I must beg that you will not snore quite so loud, lest you should awaken his majesty", and then as calmly continued his discourse."

References
W. C. Lake, Classic Preachers of the English Church (1st series, 1877).
The contemporary notice of South by Anthony Wood in his Athenae is strongly hostile, said to be due to a jest made by South at Wood's expense.

Notes

Further reading
Gerard Reedy (1992), Robert South (1634-1716): An Introduction to his Life and Sermons
Dennis Miedek (2013), Robert Souths Musica incantans, eingeleitet, ediert, übersetzt und mit Anmerkungen versehen von D. M.

Attribution

1634 births
1716 deaths
English Calvinist and Reformed theologians
English male poets
People educated at Westminster School, London
People from Hackney Central
Alumni of Christ Church, Oxford
17th-century Calvinist and Reformed theologians
Canons of Westminster
17th-century English male writers
17th-century Anglican theologians
18th-century Anglican theologians